Christian Schnell (February 19, 1838 – December 14, 1908) was an American soldier who fought for the Union Army during the American Civil War. He received the Medal of Honor for valor.

Biography
Schnell served in the 37th Ohio Infantry. He received the Medal of Honor on July 10, 1894, for his actions at the Siege of Vicksburg on May 22, 1863.

Medal of Honor citation

Citation:

Gallantry in the charge of the "volunteer storming party."

See also

List of American Civil War Medal of Honor recipients: Q-S

References

External links

Military Times

1838 births
1908 deaths
Union Army soldiers
United States Army Medal of Honor recipients
American Civil War recipients of the Medal of Honor